Danse avec les stars – La tournée is a dance show tour built upon the French show Danse avec les stars. The first tour had 21 shows, 20 in France and one in Belgium. The tour was announced in October 2013, during the fourth season of Danse avec les stars.

Stars from different seasons of Danse avec les stars joins the tour. With the stars, there are professional dancers, who also have participated the show during its seven seasons.

Participants

Tour 2013–2014

The tour had its opening evening on 19 December 2013 in Palais Omnisports de Paris-Bercy. After a small break the tour continued in January lasting till February. On 19 December, just before the first show in Paris-Bercy, the first additional show was announced for Lyon on 1 February. Another show for Lille also came on sale. For the first tour, originally four stars were announced to take a part of the tour; Lorie (season 3), Gérard Vivès (season 3), Brahim Zaibat (season 4) and Damien Sargue (season 4). After the victory of season 4, Alizée was announced to join the tour as well. Several other names were announced on the following week, including Laury Thilleman, Philippe Candeloro and Laurent Ournac.

The hosts for the show were the same as for the TV show, Sandrine Quétier and Vincent Cerutti. The jury was Jean-Marc Généreux, Chris Marques and his wife Jacklyn Spencer. After each dance the jury gave their votes but the winner of the show was decided by the public votes done by mobile phones.

Participants 2013–2014

Shows 2013–2014

Dances 2013–2014

Tour 2014–2015
For the second tour, there were 28 confirmed shows. Three of them were private shows, of which one was cancelled because of the Charlie Hebdo shooting. The tour started from Nantes on 20 December 2014 and it ended in Rouen on 28 February 2015. Like during previous tour, there was a small break after the first show before continuing the tour around France. The tour also had a show in Brussels, Belgium.

10 September 2014, Alizée announced to join the tour for all the dates starting from Nantes.

20 December 2014, Nathalie Péchalat announced to join the tour in Nice, Marseille, Paris, Bordeaux, Lyon, Montpellier and Rouen.

The hosts for the show were the same as for the TV show, Sandrine Quétier and Vincent Cerutti. The jury was Jean-Marc Généreux, Chris Marques and his wife Jacklyn Spencer. After each dance the jury gave their votes but the winner of the show was decided by the public votes done by mobile phones.

Participants 2014–2015

Shows 2014–2015
List of shows.

Private shows 2014–2015
Additional to the officially announced shows, which one could buy tickets for, there are/were some other private shows arranged for guests. Below are listed known events.

Dances 2014–2015

Tour 2016
On the third tour, there were 28 shows. This time the tour started from Marseille on 9 January 2016 and it ended in Toulouse on 5 March 2016. The tour also had a show in Brussels, Belgium.

The jury had four persons this year. Fauve Hautot joined the jury along Jean-Marc Généreux, Chris Marques and his wife Jacklyn Spencer. After each dance the jury gave their votes but the winner of the show was decided by the public votes done by mobile phones. The hosts of the shows were Sandrine Quétier and Laurent Ournac, who replaced Vincent Cerutti. Each show had only one host, either Sandrine or Laurent.

Tonya Kinzinger was injured during the last practice, a night before the tour opening show in Marseille. She was unable to continue the tour.

Alizée & Grégoire Lyonnet did not take part in the competition during the show, and hence it wasn't possible to vote for them, with exception of the first show in Marseille. On 19 January, Alizée clarified that she did not want to join the competition after doing it twice already but she was pleased to join the tour as a guest dancer. In the same interview she told that Chris Marques had asked her to replace Tonya Kinzinger, who got injured. 22 February in Paris her name appeared on the voting page again, suggesting that she took part in the competition but she still had only one dance, which got no rating by the judges. Also, after Paris, her name didn't appear on the voting page again. In some shows, during the presentation of her dance with Grégoire, the host told that Alizée was on the tour just for the passion to dance and not as part of the competition.

Participants 2016

Shows 2016 
List of shows.

Dances 2016

Tour 2017
Fourth tour had 28 shows, 27 in France and one in Belgium, like last year. The venues were mostly the same as on previous year but the order had slightly been changed. The judges for the tour were Jean-Marc Généreux, Chris Marques and Jacklyn Spencer, except on the Le grand show which had Jean-Marc Généreux, Chris Marques, Fauve Hautot and Marie-Claude Pietragalla.

Alizée and Laurent Maistret were the only celebrities to join all the 28 shows of the tour.

Participants 2017

Along the regular dancers, Philippe Candeloro, Baptiste Giabiconi, Brian Joubert, Camille Lou, Laurent Ournac, Shy'm and Tal participated for Le grand show held in Clermont-Ferrand on 4 February. Camille Lou made an appearance also in Orléans, 3 February, but she was not part of the competition. Philippe Candeloro participated in Toulouse and Bordeux, he did not participate the competition.

Shows 2017 
The show on 4 February in Clermont-Ferrand is a special televised show, including 11 celebrities and four judges (Fauve Hautot, Jean-Marc Généreux, Marie-Claude Pietragalla and Chris Marques). The show is broadcast live on TF1 channel in France.

Dances 2017

Notes

References

External links
TF1 - Danse avec les stars - La tournée

Danse avec les stars